The Liberal Democratic Party (PLD) was a classical liberal political party in France.  It was founded in 2008 by a split in the Liberal Alternative.  It seeks to fulfil the same role as the former Liberal Democracy, uniting supporters of Alain Madelin.

History

In the 2010 regional elections, the PLD were allied to Liberal Alternative and the Centrist Alliance.  In the 2012 presidential election, the PLD didn't run its own candidate, but endorsed François Bayrou in the first round and Nicolas Sarkozy in the second round.  In the 2012 legislative election, the party ran some of its own candidates, but also endorsed a number of Miscellaneous right, Union for a Popular Movement, Centrist Alliance, and Democratic Movement candidates.

See also

 Politics of France
 List of political parties in France

Footnotes

External links
  Liberal Democratic Party official website

Classical liberal parties
Political parties of the French Fifth Republic
Right-wing parties in France
Liberal parties in France
Political parties established in 2008